São Carlos Futebol Clube, more commonly referred to as São Carlos, is a Brazilian football club based in São Carlos, São Paulo. 

Founded on 25 November 2004, they play in blue and yellow shirts, blue shorts and socks.

History
The club was founded on November 25, 2004, by club company.

The mascot of the club is an Eagle.

Achievements
Campeonato Paulista Segunda divisão (Série B): Winners (2): 2005, 2015
Jogos Regionais de São Manoel-SP: 2007.

Stadium

São Carlos FC plays their matches at Luisão Stadium, inaugurated on 3 November 1968, with a maximum capacity of 10,000 people.

Trivia
The club's mascot is an eagle.
São Carlos FC is the only São Carlos's club to reach the Campeonato Paulista third division.

References

External links
Official website

 
Association football clubs established in 2004
Sao Carlos FC
São Carlos
2004 establishments in Brazil